C. cincinnata may refer to:

Clemensia cincinnata, a moth species
Cyathea cincinnata, a tree fern species